Zenza do Itombe is a town and commune in the municipality of Cambambe, province of Cuanza Norte, Angola.

Transport 
It is served by a junction railway station of the Luanda Railway. It was the place of the 2001 Angola train attack.

Namesake 
 There is another town in Angola called Zenza.

References 

Populated places in Cuanza Norte Province
Communes in Cuanza Norte Province